Chintalakunta is a residential neighbourhood in L. B. Nagar  suburb of Hyderabad, Telangana, India. In the 1980s it was a sleepy village on the outskirts of Hyderadbad. There is a checkpost here which is quite popular as a landmark.

Neighbourhoods in Hyderabad, India
Villages in Ranga Reddy district